Curt Karl Bruno von François (2 October 1852 – 28 December 1931) was a German geographer, cartographer, Schutztruppe officer and commissioner of the imperial colonial army of the German Empire, particularly in German South West Africa (today's Namibia) where he was responsible on behalf of Kaiser for the foundation of the city of Windhoek on 18 October 1890 and the harbor of Swakopmund on 4 August 1892.

Life
François was born in Luxembourg of French Huguenot ancestry. He was the son of Prussian general Bruno von François, who was killed in the battle of Spicheren. Curt's younger brother Hermann von François (1856–1933) served as a general in World War I and was one of the key contributors to the German victory at the 1914 Battle of Tannenberg. The writer Louise von François was his aunt.

Like his ancestors, young Curt von François joined the Prussian Cadet Corps. He served as a soldier in the Franco-Prussian War of 1870–71, whereby his father was killed in action during the Battle of Spicheren on 6 August 1870, and was awarded the Iron Cross. In 1883 he worked as a geographer on an exploratory expedition along the Kasai River in the Congo region under the leadership of Hermann Wissmann and two years later joined another expedition into the Congo led by George Grenfell. Back in Germany, he became a member of the German General Staff, and was elevated to the rank of Hauptmann (Captain). In 1887 he was stationed as a research officer in German West Africa. On behalf of the Foreign Office, he explored Togoland and the trade route to Salaga up to the Mossi territory in the north.

South West Africa
In 1883, the German merchant Adolf Lüderitz had purchased the coastal area of Angra Pequena, following negotiations with a local African chief. He called this coastal region of southwestern Africa Lüderitz. Fearing that the British were soon to declare the area a protectorate, Lüderitz advised the German chancellor Otto von Bismarck to claim it, which he did at the Berlin Conference of 1884. On October 7, the colony of German South West Africa was established under Reichskommissar governor Gustav Nachtigal.

However, the German authorities met with fierce resistance by the local Herero people. When in 1888 their officials were forcibly expelled from Okahandja, the German Colonial Society engaged Hauptmann Curt von François to provide security to the territory. In June 1889 he arrived with 21 troopers, 8 soldiers of the Imperial Army and 13 volunteers in the British-held enclave of Walvis Bay. Soon afterwards François stationed himself at Otjimbingwe (against the advice of acting commissioner Heinrich Göring) in order to deal with opponents to German authority in the interior of the territory. In May 1890 he renewed a former peace agreement with the Herero chief Maharero and eventually occupied the completely destroyed settlement of Windhoek (founded by Jonker Afrikaner decades earlier). Upon Maharero's death in October, his son Samuel Maharero had to reaffirm the treaty. At Windhoek, François set up the new headquarters of the German occupation (which he called Alte Feste, Old Fortress). This location was chosen because the Germans felt it would serve as a buffer zone between the Nama and Herero tribes.

After Göring was recalled from office, François served as Reichskommissar of German South West Africa from March 1891 until November 1893. Within this time period (on 12 September 1892) he established the coastal town of Swakopmund as the main harbour of German South West Africa and mapped large parts of the colony. In November 1893 he was promoted to Major and given the title of Landeshauptmann.

However, François at the same time had to cope with the rising resistance by the Nama people. On 12 April 1893 he led an attack of 225 German soldiers on Nama leader Hendrik Witbooi's headquarters at Hoornkrans west of Rehoboth. The shelling of the Oorlam kraal and its final storming led to tremendous civilian casualties. Rendered as the "Massacre of Hoornkrans" by the international press, it severely damaged François' reputation. Moreover, Witbooi escaped and fled into the Naukluft Mountains, where he waged several months of guerrilla warfare against the German forces.

François' force was formally established as the Imperial Schutztruppe for German South West Africa by the Reich Law of 9 June 1895.

Later years
In 1894 François was replaced by Theodor Leutwein as Landeshauptmann of South West Africa. He embarked in Cape Town to Germany and during the following year he retired from military life. In retirement in Zernsdorf, Brandenburg, he wrote extensively about his experiences in Africa.

Private life
Von François married Damara princess Amalia Gawaxas while in German South West Africa. They had a daughter, Josephine. His wife died soon thereafter, and he re-married in Germany. His second wife was Margarethe Meyer zu Bohmte from a wealthy family. They had four children, two of which died in their infancy.

Von François died in a Königs Wusterhausen hospital on 28 December 1931. He was interred in the Invalids' Cemetery in Berlin. The part of the cemetery where he was buried belonged to the forbidden area of the Eastern side of the Berlin Wall. This area was flattened, and of his grave only the location remained documented. From that information the grave was restored in 2018, and a tombstone was erected.

Recognition 
In front of Windhoek's municipal buildings there was a statue of von François. It was inaugurated on 18 October 1965 on the occasion of the 75th anniversary of the second foundation of the town by him. The statue was controversial in Windhoek, and several calls for its removal had been made prior to being taken down on 23 November 2022.

The original Schutztruppe headquarters built at the behest of François in 1890 at Windhoek was expanded in 1912, and has been a museum since 1962.

Written works 
 Reise im Hinterlandes des deutschen Schutzgebiets Togo, Mitteilungen Von Forschungsreisenden Und Gelehrten Aus Den Deutschen Schutzgebieten I, Berlin 1888 - Travel in the Hinterland of the German Togo Conservation Area, Communications from Researchers and Scholars from the German Protected Areas
 Die Erforschung des Tschuapa und Lulongo : Reisen in Centralafrika, Brockhaus, Leipzig 1888. - Exploration of Tschuapa and Lulongo: Travels in Central Africa.
 Deutsch-Südwest-Afrika, Verlag D. Reimer, Berlin 1899. - German South West Africa.
 Kriegführung in Süd-Afrika, Dietrich Reimer, Berlin 1900. - Warfare in South Africa.
 Lehren aus dem Südafrikanischen Kriege für das deutsche Heer. with eight sketches, Verlag E. S. Mittler & Sohn, Berlin 1901. - Lessons from the South African War for the German army.
 Der Hottentotten-Aufstand. Studie über die Vorgänge im Namalande v. Jan. 1904 bis 2. Jan. 1905 u. d. Aussichten d. Niederwerfung d. Aufstandes., Berlin 1905. - The Hottentot uprising, etc.
 ''Ohne Schuss durch dick und dünn: erste Erforschung des Togohinterlandes [Without a shot through thick and thin: First exploration of the Togo Hinterland] (Privately published by Dr. Erika Götz von François in 1972)

References and external links

Biographies of Namibian personalities by Klaus Dierks

1852 births
1931 deaths
People from Luxembourg City
History of Windhoek
Colonial people in German South West Africa
German explorers of Africa
Burials at the Invalids' Cemetery
German military personnel of the Franco-Prussian War
Prussian Army personnel
Schutztruppe personnel
Recipients of the Iron Cross (1870), 2nd class